The 1994 Georgia Southern Eagles football team represented Georgia Southern University as a member of the Southern Conference (SoCon) during the 1994 NCAA Division I-AA football season. Led by fifth-year head coach Tim Stowers, Georgia Southern compiled an overall record of 6–5 with a conference mark of 5–3, trying for third place in the SoCon. The Eagles played their home games at Paulson Stadium in Statesboro, Georgia.

Schedule

References

Georgia Southern
Georgia Southern Eagles football seasons
Georgia Southern Eagles football